Sveti Peter is a village in the Municipality of Piran in the Littoral region of Slovenia.

Name
The name of the settlement was changed from Sveti Peter (literally, 'Saint Peter') to Raven (literally, 'plain') in 1955. The name was changed on the basis of the 1948 Law on Names of Settlements and Designations of Squares, Streets, and Buildings as part of efforts by Slovenia's postwar communist government to remove religious elements from toponyms. The name Sveti Peter was restored in 1992. The settlement is also known locally as Šupeter.

Church
The local church is dedicated to Saint Peter.

References

External links

Sveti Peter on Geopedia
Sveti Peter internet site

Populated places in the Municipality of Piran